Fox Crime (stylized as FOXCRIME) is a television network, launched by the Fox Networks Group, which airs across several countries of Europe, Africa and Asia such as Italy, Portugal, Serbia, Bulgaria, and Turkey. Its basic programming include numerous television series, sitcoms and movies, among others, related to crime, horror and investigation.

It was first launched in Italy on 31 October 2004, Bulgaria on 13 October 2006, Portugal on 28 September 2007, Hong Kong on 3 May 2008, Singapore on 2 October 2006, and in Vietnam on 29 October 2007. Fox Crime was also launched in the Philippines on 1 January 2008, on Sky Cable. In Indonesia, the channel was made available via Indovision in the middle of 2010. Later, it was launched in Thailand on 29 July 2010. Since 2016, Fox crime is available in MENACE Regions via AD Drama HD and via Elife in the United Arab Emirates.

FX and BabyTV channel was launched along with in India on March 25, 2009. Fox Channels India had received downlink strikes from the I&B Ministry of Italy for the three channels on March 12, 2009. However India and Sri Lanka were currently using the Asian Feed. Fox Crime HD was launched in Asia in May, 2016 via AsiaSat 5, in Latvia it was launched along with Fox Life and National Geographic Channel on October 1, 2011. In 2013 the channel was launched in Africa as part of StarSat. The channel in Africa officially closed on September 30, 2016, but FOX Crime continued broadcasting in Ages and Maindubs with a Portuguese version. The channel has been owned by the International Operations division of The Walt Disney Company since March 2019.

As of 2023, the channel is still active in only three regions: Portugal, Bulgaria and the Balkans.

Programming 
 The Alienist 
 Body of Proof (Bulgaria)
 Bones 
 Breakout Kings
 Broadchurch
 Brotherhood
 Burn Notice
 Castle 
 The Closer
 Crime Town USA
 COPS
 Criminal Minds
 Detroit 1-8-7
 Dexter
Edison ( Film )
Hannibal Movie Night ( Film - Bulgaria )
Eastern Promises ( Film )
 Donnie Brasco ( Film - Bulgaria )
 Flashpoint 
 Hope Springs
 Hustle
 The Glades
 Journeyman
 Las Vegas
 Law & Order
 Law & Order: Criminal Intent
 Law & Order: Special Victims Unit
 Law & Order: UK
 Major Crimes 
 Missing
 Monk
 Moonlighting
 Murder in the First
 
 Night Stalker
 Numb3rs
 Prison Break
 ReGenesis
 Republic of Doyle
 Romanzo criminale – La serie (Bulgaria)
 Rookie Blue
 Sleepers ( Film )
 Shetland (Portugal)
 The Blacklist
 The Chicago Code
 The District
 The Killing
 The Killpoint
 The Listener
 The Practice
 The Sopranos 
 The Walking Dead
 The Godfather 1,2,3 (film)
 Underbelly
 White Collar 
 World's Wildest Police Videos
Out Of Time ( Film )
36 ( Film )

Fox Crime Turkey 
 Breakout Kings
 Bull
 Common Law
 CSI: Crime Scene Investigation
 CSI: Miami
 CSI: NY
 Homeland
 Jo
 Luther
 Murdoch Mysteries
 NYC 22
 Medium
 MacGyver
 N.C.I.S.
 N.C.I.S.: Los Angeles
 Shark
 The Chicago Code
 The Glades
 The Killing
 Vegas

See also
 Fox Crime (Australian TV channel)
 Fox Crime (Asian TV channel)
 Fox Crime (Italy)

References

External links
 Fox Crime official Italian website (now redirects to Disney+)

Fox Networks Group
Television channels in Norway
Television channels in North Macedonia
Television channels and stations established in 2005